In genetics, a non-paternity event (also known as misattributed paternity, not parent expected, or NPE) is the situation in which someone who is presumed to be an individual's father is not in fact the biological father. This presumption of NPE is a subset of a misattributed parentage experience (MPE) which may be on the part of the individual, the parents, or the attending midwife, physician or nurse.  An MPE may result from sperm donation, undisclosed adoption, heteropaternal superfecundation, promiscuity, paternity fraud, or sexual assault, as well as medical mistakes, for example, mixups during procedures such as in vitro fertilization and artificial insemination. Where there is uncertainty, the most reliable technique for establishing paternity is genetic testing; however, there is still a risk of error due to the potential for gene mutations or scoring errors.

Overall, the incidence of misattributed parentage experiences ranges from about 0.4% to 5.9%, though it may be higher in certain populations. The discovery of previously unsuspected or undisclosed non-paternity may have both social and medical consequences. Non-paternity that is due to a previously undisclosed extra-marital relationship often has serious consequences for a marital relationship. Non-paternity is medically relevant when interpreting the results and utility of genetic screening for hereditary illnesses.

Definitions and uses
The term nonpaternity event was first used in 2000 in a study of the surname "Skyes" and the Y-chromosome haplotype to denote if non-Skyes males had been introduced into the family line. Bellis et al. (2005) stated that misattributed paternity "occurs when a child is believed to have been fathered by the husband (or partner) but is actually the child of another man." Non-paternity events are also sometimes referred to as misattributed paternity, paternal discrepancy or false paternity. Although it is sometimes referred to as paternity fraud, that suggests that the misattribution was deliberate, rather than accidental. In a scientific review of non-paternity studies since the 1950s, Bellis et al. (2005) stated that knowingly covering up an accidental pregnancy that resulted from infidelity is often assumed to be the reason for non-paternity but that there are many other reasons: "for example, where sex with the long term partner has not produced children a woman might seek conception elsewhere." They said other reasons might be undisclosed adoptions, accidental misattribution resulting from multiple relationships in close succession as well as medical mistakes, such as mixups during procedures such as in vitro fertilization and artificial insemination.

In genetic genealogy, the term non-paternity is often used in a wider context to indicate a break in the link between the Y-chromosome and the surname. Such a breakage may occur because of formal or informal adoption, premarital or extramarital intercourse or rape; a woman raising a grandchild as her own to cover for her unwed daughter's pregnancy or when individuals use a different surname than their biological father, such as their mother's maiden name, a stepfather's name, the use of aliases or a legal name change. Example: Volkonsky.

Testing for non-paternity

The most reliable test for paternity is genetic testing, also known as DNA testing. Requirements for consent and counseling vary by country. However, genetic testing is based on probabilities and is not always definitive. Jones et al. (2010) said, "Characteristics of the markers and the fact that they are analyzed by fallible humans can result in inconsistencies that present problems for parentage analysis." False negatives may occur due to low-quality samples, gene mutations, or genotyping errors (when a genotype is misread or inaccurately scored). There is a higher probability of accuracy when DNA from both parents can be tested. The accuracy increases even more when DNA from a sibling is available.

Rates of non-paternity

Typical births
It is difficult to accurately estimate the incidence of misattributed paternity, and there have been large discrepancies in the research published on the topic. Often, data on non-paternity rates are reported tangentially to the primary goal of research without sufficient detail, and very few studies involve randomized samples. As such, it is not possible to make valid generalizations based on a large portion of the available literature. Bellis et al. (2005) found that between 1950 and 2004, the rates of misattributed paternity published in scientific journals ranged from 0.8% to 30% with a median of 3.7%. According to a study published in the Lancet, "High rates have been quoted, but are often unsupported by any published evidence or based on unrepresentative population samples."

Turi King and Mark Jobling of the Department of Genetics at University of Leicester called the commonly cited 30% rate of non-paternity an "urban myth." According to King and Jobling, the figure is really around 2%. They also stated that misattributed paternity is often impacted by cultural and socioeconomic factors and that it occurs more frequently among unmarried couples. The sociologist Michael Gilding concluded that inflated figures have been circulated by the media, the paternity testing industry, fathers' rights activists and evolutionary psychologists. He traced many of those overestimates back to a 1972 conference at which non-paternity rates as high as 30% were discussed. Gilding states that those data show only the incidence of non-paternity in which disputed parentage was the reason for paternity testing. In situations that disputed parentage was the reason for the paternity testing, there were higher levels with an incidence of 17% to 33% (median of 26.9%). Most at risk of parental discrepancy were those born to younger parents, to unmarried couples and those of lower socio-economic status or from certain ethnic and cultural groups.

Atypical multiple births

Rarely, genetic testing has revealed children from multiple births to have different fathers, which is known as "heteropaternal superfecundation." One study estimated that the incidence of bipaternal twins born to white women in the United States is around one pair in 400. Another study found the prevalence to be approximately one pair in 13,000 cases.

See also
 Cuckoldry
 Cicisbeo
 Issue (genealogy)
 Legitimacy (family law)
 Children of the plantation

References

Genealogy
Genetic genealogy
Kinship and descent
Child support
Fathers' rights
Family law
Paternity
Reproductive rights